RhymeZone is a website and app, owned and operated by Datamuse, created as an online dictionary in 1996 to allow users to search for rhymes, synonyms and definitions.

History 
RhymeZone has two websites, one for the Spanish language and one for the English language. The Spanish website is named rimar.io (or Rhyme.io when translated to English), while the English website is named rhymezone.com. Rhymezone also has an app for iOS, Android, and Amazon Alexa. In Google Docs, Rhymezone has its own add-on called OneLook Thesaurus.

Notable users
During a 2011 Reddit AMA, American musical comedian Bo Burnham mentioned RhymeZone when asked if he uses any websites to help him write lyrics.

References

External links 
 
 

Internet properties established in 1996
Online dictionaries